The following is a list of Special Areas of Conservation in the Republic of Ireland, as listed by the National Parks and Wildlife Service (NPWS).  Since 2020, the NPWS has operated under the aegis of the Department of Housing, Local Government and Heritage. The Special Areas of Conservation are part of the Natura 2000 network of sites within the European Union for special flora or fauna.

Connacht

Leinster

Munster

Ulster

Offshore

See also
 List of Special Protection Areas in the Republic of Ireland
 List of Special Areas of Conservation in Northern Ireland
 List of Special Areas of Conservation in Wales
 List of Special Areas of Conservation in Scotland
 List of Special Areas of Conservation in England

References

Sources
 Special Areas of Conservation (SAC) dataset from the National Park and Wildlife Service available under CC-BY-SA 4.0 licence

External links
 Datasets - Natura 2000
 Datasets Viewer - Natura 2000
 Natura 2000 Sites for Nature Conservation